Brabantio (sometimes called Brabanzio) is a character in William Shakespeare's Othello (c. 1601–1604). He is a Venetian senator and the father of Desdemona.  He has entertained Othello in his home countless times before the play opens, thus giving Othello and Desdemona opportunity to fall in love.  He is furious upon learning they have eloped, and Desdemona's decision is reported to be the cause of his death in the last act. The character has no counterpart in Shakespeare's source material for the play and is apparently the Bard's complete invention.  He appears in the first act only and is mentioned in the fifth.

Origin
Othello has its source in the 1565 tale "Un Capitano Moro" from Giovanni Battista Giraldi Cinthio's Gli Hecatommithi, a collection of 100 tales in the vein of Boccacio's Decameron.  While no English translation of Cinthio was available in Shakespeare's lifetime, it is possible Shakespeare knew both the Italian original and Gabriel Chappuy's 1584 French translation.  He may have had access to an English translation in manuscript.  Cinthio's tale may have been based on an actual incident occurring in Venice about 1508.

While the principal characters in Shakespeare's play have their counterparts in Cinthio's tale, Brabantio is Shakespeare's invention. The relatives of Cinthio's Disdemona avenge her death in the closing moments of his tale, but her father is not mentioned as being among them.

Role in Othello
Brabantio makes his first appearance in 1.1 when Iago and Roderigo rouse him with the news that Desdemona has eloped.  In 1.2, Brabantio is led to the Sagittary, where the newlyweds are found and there accuses Othello of using magic to bewitch his daughter.  In 1.3, he brings Othello to trial before the Duke and once again accuses him of using witchcraft upon his daughter.  When Desdemona arrives, she tells her father that she respects him only because they are related, and that Othello is whom she truly loves. Brabantio grudgingly accepts what she says, but not without complaining to the senators in an attempt at having Othello stripped of his title; when this is unsuccessful, he disowns his daughter. In the last scene of the play, 5.2, Brabantio's brother Graziano states that Brabantio died of grief after losing his daughter to Othello.

Performances
The first recorded mention of Othello is found in a Revels account indicating the play was performed at Whitehall Palace on 1 November 1604.  The cast list of the performance is likely lost to time, but legend has Shakespeare appearing on stage in minor roles such as Old Adam in As You Like It, and, thus, it is not inconceivable that Shakespeare himself may have played Brabantio. It is possible the actor playing Brabantio "doubled-up" and performed another character appearing later in the play.

Film interpreters of the role include Friedrich Kühne in the 1922 silent version starring Emil Jannings, Hilton Edwards in Orson Welles' 1952 film, Anthony Nicholls in Laurence Olivier's 1965 film, and Pierre Vaneck in the 1995 film starring Laurence Fishburne.

References

Bibliography
 Bevington, David and William Shakespeare. Four Tragedies. Bantam, 1988.

Literary characters introduced in 1603
Fictional senators
Fictional Italian people in literature
Male Shakespearean characters
Othello